Sextans B (also known as UGC 5373 and DDO 70) is an irregular galaxy that may be part of the Local Group, or lie just beyond it. Sextans B is 4.44 million light-years away from Earth and thus is one of the most distant members of the Local Group, if it is indeed a member. It forms a pair with its neighbouring galaxy Sextans A. It is a type Ir IV–V galaxy according to the galaxy morphological classification scheme. Sextans B may also be gravitationally associated with the galaxies NGC 3109 and the Antlia Dwarf.

Sextans B has a uniform stellar population, but the interstellar medium in it may be inhomogeneous. Its mass is estimated to be about 2 times the mass of the Sun, of which 5.5 is in the form of atomic hydrogen. Star formation in the galaxy seems to have proceeded in distinct periods of low intensity, separated by shorter periods of no activity. The existence of Cepheid variables in the galaxy implies that Sextans B contains at least some young stars. The metallicity of Sextans B is very low, with a value of approximately Z = 0.001.

Five planetary nebulae have been identified in Sextans B, which is one of the smallest galaxies where planetary nebulae have been observed. These appear point-like and can be identified by their spectral emission lines. It also contains a massive globular cluster.

References

External links

 

Dwarf galaxies
Irregular galaxies
Sextans (constellation)
05373
28913
NGC 3109 subgroup